Latvia women's national floorball team is the national team of Latvia. , the team was ranked tenth by the International Floorball Federation.

References 

Women's national under-19 floorball teams
Floorball